Yolmeh Salian (also Romanized as Yolmeh Sālīān, Yolmeh Sālīyān, and Yulmeh Sālīān) is a village in Mazraeh-ye Shomali Rural District, Voshmgir District, Aqqala County, Golestan Province, Iran. At the 2006 census, its population was 3,263, in 678 families.

References 

Populated places in Aqqala County